
Yanhe may refer to:

Places in China
 Yanhe Tujia Autonomous County, a county in Guizhou
Yanhe Subdistrict (研和街道), a subdistrict in Hongta District, Yuxi, Yunnan

Towns
Yanhe, Heilongjiang (延河), a town in Yanshou County, Heilongjiang
Yanhe, Huai'an (盐河), a town in Huai'an, Jiangsu
Yanhe, Jianhu County (沿河), a town in Jianhu County, Jiangsu

Townships
Yanhe Township, Chongqing (沿河乡), a township in Chengkou County, Chongqing
Yanhe Township, Sichuan (沿河乡), a township in Dazhou, Sichuan

Historical eras
Yanhe (延和, 432–435), era name used by Emperor Taiwu of Northern Wei
Yanhe (延和, 712), era name used by Emperor Ruizong of Tang

Others
Yanhe (software)

See also
Yanghe (disambiguation)